The first season of The Voice Kids of Vietnam (Vietnamese: Giọng Hát Việt Nhí) began on June 1, 2013. The show is co-hosted by Trấn Thành and Thanh Thảo. The judges are Thanh Bùi, husband-and-wife duo Hồ Hoài Anh & Lưu Hương Giang, and Hiền Thục.

Blind Auditions
Blind auditions take place from June 1, 2013 to June 29, 2013. Each judge will be facing away from the contestants in chairs. If they like what they hear, they can press the red "TÔI CHỌN BẠN" (I WANT YOU) button in front of them to turn around. If more than one coach turns around, the contestant must then choose which team they want to be on. If none of the judges turn around, the contestant is eliminated.

Episode 1: Blind Auditions, Part 1

Episode 2: Blind Auditions, Part 2

Episode 3: Blind Auditions, Part 3

Episode 4: Blind Auditions, Part 4

† Hồ Hoài Anh pressed Thanh Bùi's button. However at the time, Thanh Bùi also expressed his wish to press it.

Episode 5: Blind Auditions, Part 5

References

Kids
2013 Vietnamese television seasons